John Arthur Engebretsen (1 March 1892 – 16 October 1956) was a New Zealand lawn bowls player, who won a bronze medal for his country at the 1950 British Empire Games.

Early life and family
Born on 1 March 1892, Engebretsen was the son of Annie Paulina Engebretsen (née Pedersen) and Otto Engebretsen. He was educated at Dannevirke High School.

On 20 May 1914, Engebretsen married Katherine Jack Nicol.

Teaching career
Engebretsen became a schoolteacher, and in February 1941 he took up the post of headmaster at Mahora School in Hastings. He served in that role until retiring in May 1951.

Lawn bowls
Engebretsen won two national lawn bowls championship titles: the men's singles representing the Napier Bowling Club in 1935; and as skip of the Heretaunga Bowling Club combination that won the men's fours in 1945.

At the 1950 British Empire Games in Auckland, he was a member of the New Zealand men's four—alongside teammates Fred Russell, Noel Jolly and Pete Skoglund—that won the bronze medal.

Later life and death
Engebretsen died on 16 October 1956, and was buried at Hastings Cemetery. He had been predeceased by his wife, Kate, in 1951.

References

External links
 Photograph of Engebretsen with the other members of the New Zealand champion four from 1945

1892 births
1956 deaths
New Zealand people of Norwegian descent
People educated at Dannevirke High School
Heads of schools in New Zealand
New Zealand male bowls players
Commonwealth Games bronze medallists for New Zealand
Bowls players at the 1950 British Empire Games
Commonwealth Games medallists in lawn bowls
Sportspeople from Dannevirke
Burials at Hastings Cemetery, New Zealand
Medallists at the 1950 British Empire Games